Oliver Drachta (born 15 May 1977) is an Austrian professional football referee. He has been a full international for FIFA since 2010.

References 

1977 births
Living people
Austrian football referees